A formula, in mathematics, is an entity constructed using the symbols and formation rules of a given logical language.

Formula may also refer to:

 A concept in the theory of oral-formulaic composition, related to oral poetry
 A type of ritual in Roman law
 A defunct video game label of Lost Boys Games, a defunct Dutch game developer
 Bill of materials
 Chemical formula, an expression of the contents of a chemical compound
 Dave Formula (born 1946), British musician
 Formula (album), a 1995 album by OLD
 Formula (boats), a brand of pleasure boats
 Formula fiction, literature following a predictable form
 Formula language, a Lotus Notes programming language
 Formula racing, a type of motorsport
 Formulæ (album), a 2016 album by Master's Hammer
 Infant formula, a food for infants
 Trinitarian formula, a Biblical phrase
 Well-formed formula, a word that is part of a formal language, in logic
 "[Formula]" (ΔMi−1 = −αΣn=1NDi[n] [Σj∈C[i]Fji[n − 1] + Fexti[n−1]]), the first B-side of "Windowlicker" by Aphex Twin, also known as "[Equation]"

See also
 Formulation
 The Formula (disambiguation)